Eskola is an Estonian and Finnish surname. Notable people with the surname include:

 Ants Eskola (1908–1989), Estonian actor and singer
 Chris Eskola (b. 1976), American musician
 Jalmari Eskola (1886–1958), Finnish athlete
 Olev Eskola (1914–1990), Estonian actor
 Pentti Eskola (1883–1964), Finnish geologist
 Seikko Eskola (b. 1933), Finnish historian

Estonian-language surnames
Finnish-language surnames